Super Ropes are a brand of candy manufactured by American Licorice Company. It comes in Rollin' Red, cherry, and strawberry flavors.

External links
 Super Ropes at the American Licorice Company

American Licorice Company brands